Los Priscos were a criminal group affiliated with the Medellin cartel in Colombia. In the 1980s and early 1990s they participated in several assassinations in Colombia. They were often described as functioning like the ‘armed-wing of Medellin’.

The group is named after the four Prisco Lopera brothers: Armando Alberto, Eneas, Jose Rodolfo and David Ricardo. Another fifth brother, Conrado Antonio, a doctor. Conrad was well respected in the medical community yet was the personal physician to Pablo Escobar. Conrado is thought to have been kidnapped and murdered on the orders of Pablo Escobar in Cocorná, in eastern Antioquia. Another doctor Edgar de Jesus Botero Prisco, a first cousin to the brothers was also killed.

The Priscos were involved in murder and attacks that the head of the Medellin cartel, Pablo Escobar, ordered between 1984 and 1990. They have been linked to the assassinations of Justice Minister Rodrigo Lara Bonilla, director of El Espectador, Guillermo Cano Isaza; Hernando Baquero Borda magistrate; First Superior Judge Tulio Manuel Castro Gil; Attorney Carlos Mauro Hoyos, governor of Antioquia, Antonio Roldan Betancur; Colonel Waldemar Franklin Quintero, Colonel Jaime Ramirez, the head of the transit section of Medellin, Mauro Alfredo Benjumea, of the judges of the Court of that city, Alvaro Medina Ochoa and Gustavo Zuluaga Serna, and an attack on Chamber representative Alberto Villamizar, among other crimes.

This criminal group was dismantled on January 22, 1991, when David Ricardo Prisco, head of the organization, died on the same day as his brother Armando, in two separate operations developed by the National Police of Colombia in Medellin and Rionegro respectively.

References

Organizations established in the 1980s
1980s establishments in Colombia
Organizations disestablished in 1991
1991 disestablishments in Colombia
Medellín Cartel
Organized crime groups in Colombia
Terrorism in Colombia